Moon rock or lunar rock is rock originating from Earth's Moon. This includes lunar material collected during the course of human exploration of the Moon, and rock that has been ejected naturally from the Moon's surface and landed on Earth as meteorites.

Sources
Moon rocks on Earth come from four sources: those collected by six United States Apollo program crewed lunar landings from 1969 to 1972; those collected by three Soviet uncrewed Luna probes in the 1970s; those collected by the Chinese Lunar Exploration Program's uncrewed probes; and rocks that were ejected naturally from the lunar surface before falling to Earth as lunar meteorites.

Apollo program
Six Apollo missions collected 2,200 samples of material weighing , processed into more than 110,000 individually cataloged samples.

Luna program

The Soviet Union abandoned its attempts at a crewed lunar program in the 1970s, but succeeded in landing three robotic Luna spacecraft with the capability to collect and return small samples to Earth. A combined total of less than half a kilogram of material was returned.

In 1993, three small rock fragments from Luna 16, weighing 200 mg, were sold for US$ 442,500 at Sotheby's. In 2018, the same three Luna 16 rock fragments sold for US$ 855,000 at Sotheby's.

Chang'e

Chang'e 5, the fifth lunar exploration mission of the Chinese Lunar Exploration Program returned with ~ of samples.

Lunar meteorites
Some were discovered by scientific teams (such as ANSMET) searching for meteorites in Antarctica, with most of the remainder discovered by collectors in the desert regions of northern Africa and Oman. A Moon rock known as "NWA 12691", which weighs , was found in the Sahara Desert at the Algerian and Mauritanian borders in January 2017, and later went on sale for $2.5 million in 2020.

Dating

Rocks from the Moon have been measured by radiometric dating techniques. They range in age from about 3.16 billion years old for the basaltic samples derived from the lunar maria, up to about 4.44 billion years old for rocks derived from the highlands. Based on the age-dating technique of "crater counting," the youngest basaltic eruptions are believed to have occurred about 1.2 billion years ago, but scientists do not possess samples of these lavas. In contrast, the oldest ages of rocks from the Earth are between 3.8 and 4.28 billion years old.

Composition

Moon rocks fall into two main categories: those found in the lunar highlands (terrae), and those in the maria. The terrae consist dominantly of mafic plutonic rocks. Regolith breccias with similar protoliths are also common. Mare basalts come in three distinct series in direct relation to their titanium content: high-Ti basalts, low-Ti basalts, and Very Low-Ti (VLT) basalts.

Almost all lunar rocks are depleted in volatiles and are completely lacking in hydrated minerals common in Earth rocks. In some regards, lunar rocks are closely related to Earth's rocks in their isotopic composition of the element oxygen. The Apollo Moon rocks were collected using a variety of tools, including hammers, rakes, scoops, tongs, and core tubes. Most were photographed prior to collection to record the condition in which they were found. They were placed inside sample bags and then a Special Environmental Sample Container for return to the Earth to protect them from contamination. In contrast to the Earth, large portions of the lunar crust appear to be composed of rocks with high concentrations of the mineral anorthite. The mare basalts have relatively high iron values. Furthermore, some of the mare basalts have very high levels of titanium (in the form of ilmenite).

Highlands rocks

Primary igneous rocks in the lunar highlands compose three distinct groups: the ferroan anorthosite suite, the magnesian suite, and the alkali suite.

Lunar breccias, formed largely by the immense basin-forming impacts, are dominantly composed of highland lithologies because most mare basalts post-date basin formation (and largely fill these impact basins).

The ferroan anorthosite suite consists almost exclusively of the rock anorthosite (>90% calcic plagioclase) with less common anorthositic gabbro (70-80% calcic plagioclase, with minor pyroxene). The ferroan anorthosite suite is the most common group in the highlands, and is inferred to represent plagioclase flotation cumulates of the lunar magma ocean, with interstitial mafic phases formed from trapped interstitial melt or rafted upwards with the more abundant plagioclase framework. The plagioclase is extremely calcic by terrestrial standards, with molar anorthite contents of 94–96% (An94–96). This reflects the extreme depletion of the bulk Moon in alkalis (Na, K) as well as water and other volatile elements. In contrast, the mafic minerals in this suite have low Mg/Fe ratios that are inconsistent with calcic plagioclase compositions. Ferroan anorthosites have been dated using the internal isochron method at circa 4.4 Ga.
The magnesian suite (or "mg suite) consists of dunites (>90% olivine), troctolites (olivine-plagioclase), and gabbros (plagioclase-pyroxene) with relatively high Mg/Fe ratios in the mafic minerals and a range of plagioclase compositions that are still generally calcic (An86–93). These rocks represent later intrusions into the highlands crust (ferroan anorthosite) at round 4.3–4.1 Ga. An interesting aspect of this suite is that analysis of the trace element content of plagioclase and pyroxene requires equilibrium with a KREEP-rich magma, despite the refractory major element contents.
The alkali suite is so-called because of its high alkali content—for Moon rocks. The alkali suite consists of alkali anorthosites with relatively sodic plagioclase (An70–85), norites (plagioclase-orthopyroxene), and gabbronorites (plagioclase-clinopyroxene-orthopyroxene) with similar plagioclase compositions and mafic minerals more iron-rich than the magnesian suite. The trace element content of these minerals also indicates a KREEP-rich parent magma. The alkali suite spans an age range similar to the magnesian suite.
Lunar granites are relatively rare rocks that include diorites, monzodiorites, and granophyres. They consist of quartz, plagioclase, orthoclase or alkali feldspar, rare mafics (pyroxene), and rare zircon. The alkali feldspar may have unusual compositions unlike any terrestrial feldspar, and they are often Ba-rich. These rocks apparently form by the extreme fractional crystallization of magnesian suite or alkali suite magmas, although liquid immiscibility may also play a role. U-Pb date of zircons from these rocks and from lunar soils have ages of 4.1–4.4 Ga, more or less the same as the magnesian suite and alkali suite rocks. In the 1960s, NASA researcher John A. O'Keefe and others linked lunar granites with tektites found on Earth although many researchers refuted these claims. According to one study, a portion of lunar sample 12013 has a chemistry that closely resembles javanite tektites found on Earth.
Lunar breccias range from glassy vitrophyre melt rocks, to glass-rich breccia, to regolith breccias. The vitrophyres are dominantly glassy rocks that represent impact melt sheets that fill large impact structures. They contain few clasts of the target lithology, which is largely melted by the impact. Glassy breccias form from impact melt that exit the crater and entrain large volumes of crushed (but not melted) ejecta. It may contain abundant clasts that reflect the range of lithologies in the target region, sitting in a matrix of mineral fragments plus glass that welds it all together. Some of the clasts in these breccias are pieces of older breccias, documenting a repeated history of impact brecciation, cooling, and impact. Regolith breccias resemble the glassy breccias but have little or no glass (melt) to weld them together. As noted above, the basin-forming impacts responsible for these breccias pre-date almost all mare basalt volcanism, so clasts of mare basalt are very rare. When found, these clasts represent the earliest phase of mare basalt volcanism preserved.

Mare basalts

Mare basalts are named as such because they frequently constitute large portions of the lunar maria. These typically contain 18–21 percent FeO by weight, and 1–13 percent TiO2. They are similar to terrestrial basalts, but have many important differences; for example, mare basalts show a large negative europium anomaly. The type location is Mare Crisium sampled by Luna 24.
 
 KREEP Basalts (and borderline VHK (Very High K) basalts) have extraordinary potassium content. These contain 13–16 percent Al2O3, 9–15 percent FeO, and are enriched in magnesium and incompatible elements (potassium, phosphorus and rare earth elements) 100–150 times compared to ordinary chondrite meteorites. These are commonly encountered around the Oceanus Procellarum, and are identified in remote sensing by their high (about 10 ppm) thorium contents. Most of incompatible elements in KREEP basalts are incorporated in the grains of the phosphate minerals apatite and merrillite.

Curation and availability

The main repository for the Apollo Moon rocks is the Lunar Sample Laboratory Facility at the Lyndon B. Johnson Space Center in Houston, Texas. For safekeeping, there is also a smaller collection stored at White Sands Test Facility in Las Cruces, New Mexico. Most of the rocks are stored in nitrogen to keep them free of moisture. They are handled only indirectly, using special tools.

Some Moon rocks from the Apollo missions are displayed in museums, and a few allow visitors to touch them. One of these, called the Touch Rock, is displayed in the Smithsonian National Air and Space Museum in Washington, D.C. The idea of having touchable Moon rocks at a museum was suggested by Apollo scientist Farouk El-Baz, who was inspired by his childhood pilgrimage to Mecca where he touched the Black Stone (which in Islam is believed to be sent down from the heavens).

Moon rocks collected during the course of lunar exploration are currently considered priceless. In 2002, a safe was stolen from the Lunar Sample Building that contained minute samples of lunar and Martian material.

Naturally transported Moon rocks in the form of lunar meteorites are sold and traded among private collectors.

Goodwill Moon rocks 

Apollo 17 astronauts Eugene Cernan and Harrison Schmitt picked up a rock "composed of many fragments, of many sizes, and many shapes, probably from all parts of the Moon". This rock was later labeled sample 70017. President Nixon ordered that fragments of that rock should be distributed in 1973 to all 50 US states and 135 foreign heads of state. The fragments were presented encased in an acrylic sphere, mounted on a wood plaque which included the recipients' flag which had also flown aboard Apollo 17. Many of the presentation Moon rocks are now unaccounted for, having been stolen or lost.

Discoveries
Three minerals were discovered from the Moon: armalcolite, tranquillityite, and pyroxferroite. Armalcolite was named for the three astronauts on the Apollo 11 mission: Armstrong, Aldrin and Collins.

Stolen and missing Moon rocks
 
Because of their rarity on Earth, and the difficulty of obtaining more, Moon rocks have been frequent targets of theft and vandalism, and many have gone missing or were stolen.

Gallery

See also

 Sample-return mission
 Bench Crater meteorite
 Geology of the Moon
 Hadley Rille meteorite
 Helium-3
 List of Apollo lunar sample displays
 Lunar ice
 Lunar Receiving Laboratory
 Lunar regolith simulant
 Lunar resources
 Lunar soil

References

Citations

General sources 
 
 Paul D. Spudis, The Once and Future Moon, Smithsonian Institution Press, 1996, .

External links

 Rocks & Soils from the Moon—Johnson Space Center
 Apollo Geology Tool Catalog
 Lunar meteorites —Washington University, Department of Earth and Planetary Sciences
 Lunar Samples Lunar and Planetary Institute
 Articles about Moon rocks in Planetary Science Research Discoveries educational journal
 Where Today are the Apollo 11 Lunar Sample Displays? collectSPACE
 Where Today are the Apollo 17 Goodwill Moon Rocks? collectSPACE
 Kentucky's lunar sample displays in the Kentucky Historical Society objects catalog: Apollo 11, Apollo 17

 
Apollo program
Extraterrestrial rocks
Igneous rocks
Lunar science
Petrology